Andrey Andreyevich Sobolev (born 27 November 1989) is a Russian snowboarder, specializing in Alpine snowboarding and formerly specializing in snowboard cross. He is the brother of Olympic snowboarder Natalia Soboleva, who is the silver medalist of the 2019 World Championships.

Career
Sobolev competed at the 2014 Winter Olympics for Russia. He was the top qualifier in the parallel giant slalom, but in the 1/8 finals, he lost to Austria's Andreas Prommegger, finishing 9th overall. He then failed to qualify for the elimination round in the parallel slalom, finishing 27th.

As of September 2014, his best showing at the World Championships is 14th, in the 2013 parallel slalom.

Sobolev made his World Cup debut in February 2007. As of September 2014, he has one podium finish, silver in parallel slalom at Jauerling in 2011–12. His best overall finish is 15th, in 2013–14.

World Cup Podiums

Individual podiums
  7 wins – (2 PS, 5 PGS)
  15 podiums – (3 PS, 12 PGS)

Team podiums
  1 podium – (1 )

Season titles
 2 titles – (1 overall, 1 parallel giant slalom)

References

External links

1989 births
Living people
Olympic snowboarders of Russia
Snowboarders at the 2014 Winter Olympics
Snowboarders at the 2018 Winter Olympics
Snowboarders at the 2022 Winter Olympics
People from Tashtagol
Russian male snowboarders
Sportspeople from Kemerovo Oblast
21st-century Russian people